Attigundi is a village in the Chikkamagalur district of Karnataka. It is governed locally by gram panchayat. It is located near the Muthodi wildlife sanctuary and the tourist destinations of Honnammana Halla waterfalls, Jhari Falls, Kavikal Gandi, Galikere, Bababudangiri and Kemmangundi. The average temperature is 20 degrees Celsius.

References 

Villages in Chikkamagaluru district